Welding is a fabrication process that joins materials, usually metals or thermoplastics, by using high heat to melt the parts together and allowing them to cool, causing fusion. Welding is distinct from lower temperature techniques such as brazing and soldering, which do not melt the base metal (parent metal).

In addition to melting the base metal, a filler material is typically added to the joint to form a pool of molten material (the weld pool) that cools to form a joint that, based on weld configuration (butt, full penetration, fillet, etc.), can be stronger than the base material. Pressure may also be used in conjunction with heat or by itself to produce a weld. Welding also requires a form of shield to protect the filler metals or melted metals from being contaminated or oxidized.

Many different energy sources can be used for welding, including a gas flame (chemical), an electric arc (electrical), a laser, an electron beam, friction, and ultrasound. While often an industrial process, welding may be performed in many different environments, including in open air, under water, and in outer space. Welding is a hazardous undertaking and precautions are required to avoid burns, electric shock, vision damage, inhalation of poisonous gases and fumes, and exposure to intense ultraviolet radiation.

Until the end of the 19th century, the only welding process was forge welding, which blacksmiths had used for millennia to join iron and steel by heating and hammering. Arc welding and oxy-fuel welding were among the first processes to develop late in the century, and electric resistance welding followed soon after. Welding technology advanced quickly during the early 20th century as world wars drove the demand for reliable and inexpensive joining methods. Following the wars, several modern welding techniques were developed, including manual methods like shielded metal arc welding, now one of the most popular welding methods, as well as semi-automatic and automatic processes such as gas metal arc welding, submerged arc welding, flux-cored arc welding and electroslag welding. Developments continued with the invention of laser beam welding, electron beam welding, magnetic pulse welding, and friction stir welding in the latter half of the century. Today, as the science continues to advance, robot welding is commonplace in industrial settings, and researchers continue to develop new welding methods and gain greater understanding of weld quality.

Etymology
The term weld is of English origin, with roots from Scandinavia. It is often confused with the Old English word , meaning 'a forested area', but this word eventually morphed into the modern version, wild. The term weld is derived from the Middle English verb well or welling, meaning 'to heat' (to the maximum temperature possible); 'to bring to a boil'. The modern word was probably derived from the past-tense participle welled, with the addition of d for this purpose being common in the Germanic languages of the Angles and Saxons. It was first recorded in English in 1590, from a version of the Christian Bible that was originally translated into English by John Wycliffe in the fourteenth century. The original version, from Isaiah 2:4, reads, "" (they shall beat together their swords into plowshares), while the 1590 version was changed to, "" (they shall weld together their swords into plowshares), suggesting this particular use of the word probably became popular in English sometime between these periods.

The word is derived from the Old Swedish word , meaning 'to boil'. The word possibly entered English from the Swedish iron trade, or possibly was imported with the thousands of Viking settlements that arrived in England before and during the Viking Age, as more than half of the most common English words in everyday use are Scandinavian in origin.

History

The history of joining metals goes back several millennia. The earliest examples of this come from the Bronze and Iron Ages in Europe and the Middle East. The ancient Greek historian Herodotus states in The Histories of the 5th century BC that Glaucus of Chios "was the man who single-handedly invented iron welding". Welding was used in the construction of the Iron pillar of Delhi, erected in Delhi, India about 310 AD and weighing 5.4 metric tons.

The Middle Ages brought advances in forge welding, in which blacksmiths pounded heated metal repeatedly until bonding occurred. In 1540, Vannoccio Biringuccio published De la pirotechnia, which includes descriptions of the forging operation. Renaissance craftsmen were skilled in the process, and the industry continued to grow during the following centuries.

In 1800, Sir Humphry Davy discovered the short-pulse electrical arc and presented his results in 1801. In 1802, Russian scientist Vasily Petrov created the continuous electric arc, and subsequently published "News of Galvanic-Voltaic Experiments" in 1803, in which he described experiments carried out in 1802. Of great importance in this work was the description of a stable arc discharge and the indication of its possible use for many applications, one being melting metals. In 1808, Davy, who was unaware of Petrov's work, rediscovered the continuous electric arc. In 1881–82 inventors Nikolai Benardos (Russian) and Stanisław Olszewski (Polish) created the first electric arc welding method known as carbon arc welding using carbon electrodes. The advances in arc welding continued with the invention of metal electrodes in the late 1800s by a Russian, Nikolai Slavyanov (1888), and an American, C. L. Coffin (1890). Around 1900, A. P. Strohmenger released a coated metal electrode in Britain, which gave a more stable arc. In 1905, Russian scientist Vladimir Mitkevich proposed using a three-phase electric arc for welding. Alternating current welding was invented by C. J. Holslag in 1919, but did not become popular for another decade.

Resistance welding was also developed during the final decades of the 19th century, with the first patents going to Elihu Thomson in 1885, who produced further advances over the next 15 years. Thermite welding was invented in 1893, and around that time another process, oxyfuel welding, became well established. Acetylene was discovered in 1836 by Edmund Davy, but its use was not practical in welding until about 1900, when a suitable torch was developed. At first, oxyfuel welding was one of the more popular welding methods due to its portability and relatively low cost. As the 20th century progressed, however, it fell out of favor for industrial applications. It was largely replaced with arc welding, as advances in metal coverings (known as flux) were made. Flux covering the electrode primarily shields the base material from impurities, but also stabilizes the arc and can add alloying components to the weld metal.

World War I caused a major surge in the use of welding, with the various military powers attempting to determine which of the several new welding processes would be best. The British primarily used arc welding, even constructing a ship, the "Fullagar" with an entirely welded hull. Arc welding was first applied to aircraft during the war as well, as some German airplane fuselages were constructed using the process. Also noteworthy is the first welded road bridge in the world, the Maurzyce Bridge in Poland (1928).

During the 1920s, significant advances were made in welding technology, including the introduction of automatic welding in 1920, in which electrode wire was fed continuously. Shielding gas became a subject receiving much attention, as scientists attempted to protect welds from the effects of oxygen and nitrogen in the atmosphere. Porosity and brittleness were the primary problems, and the solutions that developed included the use of hydrogen, argon, and helium as welding atmospheres. During the following decade, further advances allowed for the welding of reactive metals like aluminum and magnesium. This in conjunction with developments in automatic welding, alternating current, and fluxes fed a major expansion of arc welding during the 1930s and then during World War II. In 1930, the first all-welded merchant vessel, M/S Carolinian, was launched.
 
During the middle of the century, many new welding methods were invented. In 1930, Kyle Taylor was responsible for the release of stud welding, which soon became popular in shipbuilding and construction. Submerged arc welding was invented the same year and continues to be popular today. In 1932 a Russian, Konstantin Khrenov eventually implemented the first underwater electric arc welding. Gas tungsten arc welding, after decades of development, was finally perfected in 1941, and gas metal arc welding followed in 1948, allowing for fast welding of non-ferrous materials but requiring expensive shielding gases. Shielded metal arc welding was developed during the 1950s, using a flux-coated consumable electrode, and it quickly became the most popular metal arc welding process. In 1957, the flux-cored arc welding process debuted, in which the self-shielded wire electrode could be used with automatic equipment, resulting in greatly increased welding speeds, and that same year, plasma arc welding was invented by Robert Gage. Electroslag welding was introduced in 1958, and it was followed by its cousin, electrogas welding, in 1961. In 1953, the Soviet scientist N. F. Kazakov proposed the diffusion bonding method.

Other recent developments in welding include the 1958 breakthrough of electron beam welding, making deep and narrow welding possible through the concentrated heat source. Following the invention of the laser in 1960, laser beam welding debuted several decades later, and has proved to be especially useful in high-speed, automated welding. Magnetic pulse welding (MPW) has been industrially used since 1967. Friction stir welding was invented in 1991 by Wayne Thomas at The Welding Institute (TWI, UK) and found high-quality applications all over the world. All of these four new processes continue to be quite expensive due to the high cost of the necessary equipment, and this has limited their applications.

Processes

Gas welding

The most common gas welding process is oxyfuel welding, also known as oxyacetylene welding. It is one of the oldest and most versatile welding processes, but in recent years it has become less popular in industrial applications. It is still widely used for welding pipes and tubes, as well as repair work.

The equipment is relatively inexpensive and simple, generally employing the combustion of acetylene in oxygen to produce a welding flame temperature of about 3100 °C (5600 °F). The flame, since it is less concentrated than an electric arc, causes slower weld cooling, which can lead to greater residual stresses and weld distortion, though it eases the welding of high alloy steels. A similar process, generally called oxyfuel cutting, is used to cut metals.

Arc welding

These processes use a welding power supply to create and maintain an electric arc between an electrode and the base material to melt metals at the welding point. They can use either direct current (DC) or alternating current (AC), and consumable or non-consumable electrodes. The welding region is sometimes protected by some type of inert or semi-inert gas, known as a shielding gas, and filler material is sometimes used as well.

Arc welding processes

One of the most common types of arc welding is shielded metal arc welding (SMAW); it is also known as manual metal arc welding (MMAW) or stick welding. Electric current is used to strike an arc between the base material and consumable electrode rod, which is made of filler material (typical steel) and is covered with a flux that protects the weld area from oxidation and contamination by producing carbon dioxide (CO2) gas during the welding process. The electrode core itself acts as filler material, making a separate filler unnecessary.

The process is versatile and can be performed with relatively inexpensive equipment, making it well suited to shop jobs and field work. An operator can become reasonably proficient with a modest amount of training and can achieve mastery with experience. Weld times are rather slow, since the consumable electrodes must be frequently replaced and because slag, the residue from the flux, must be chipped away after welding. Furthermore, the process is generally limited to welding ferrous materials, though special electrodes have made possible the welding of cast iron, stainless steel, aluminum, and other metals.

Gas metal arc welding (GMAW), also known as metal inert gas or MIG welding, is a semi-automatic or automatic process that uses a continuous wire feed as an electrode and an inert or semi-inert gas mixture to protect the weld from contamination. Since the electrode is continuous, welding speeds are greater for GMAW than for SMAW.

A related process, flux-cored arc welding (FCAW), uses similar equipment but uses wire consisting of a steel electrode surrounding a powder fill material. This cored wire is more expensive than the standard solid wire and can generate fumes and/or slag, but it permits even higher welding speed and greater metal penetration.

Gas tungsten arc welding (GTAW), or tungsten inert gas (TIG) welding, is a manual welding process that uses a non-consumable tungsten electrode, an inert or semi-inert gas mixture, and a separate filler material. Especially useful for welding thin materials, this method is characterized by a stable arc and high-quality welds, but it requires significant operator skill and can only be accomplished at relatively low speeds.

GTAW can be used on nearly all weldable metals, though it is most often applied to stainless steel and light metals. It is often used when quality welds are extremely important, such as in bicycle, aircraft and naval applications. A related process, plasma arc welding, also uses a tungsten electrode but uses plasma gas to make the arc. The arc is more concentrated than the GTAW arc, making transverse control more critical and thus generally restricting the technique to a mechanized process. Because of its stable current, the method can be used on a wider range of material thicknesses than can the GTAW process and it is much faster. It can be applied to all of the same materials as GTAW except magnesium, and automated welding of stainless steel is one important application of the process. A variation of the process is plasma cutting, an efficient steel cutting process.

Submerged arc welding (SAW) is a high-productivity welding method in which the arc is struck beneath a covering layer of flux. This increases arc quality since contaminants in the atmosphere are blocked by the flux. The slag that forms on the weld generally comes off by itself, and combined with the use of a continuous wire feed, the weld deposition rate is high. Working conditions are much improved over other arc welding processes, since the flux hides the arc and almost no smoke is produced. The process is commonly used in industry, especially for large products and in the manufacture of welded pressure vessels. Other arc welding processes include atomic hydrogen welding, electroslag welding (ESW), electrogas welding, and stud arc welding. ESW is a highly productive, single-pass welding process for thicker materials between 1 inch (25 mm) and 12 inches (300 mm) in a vertical or close to vertical position.

Arc welding power supplies
To supply the electrical power necessary for arc welding processes, a variety of different power supplies can be used. The most common welding power supplies are constant current power supplies and constant voltage power supplies. In arc welding, the length of the arc is directly related to the voltage, and the amount of heat input is related to the current. Constant current power supplies are most often used for manual welding processes such as gas tungsten arc welding and shielded metal arc welding, because they maintain a relatively constant current even as the voltage varies. This is important because in manual welding, it can be difficult to hold the electrode perfectly steady, and as a result, the arc length and thus voltage tend to fluctuate. Constant voltage power supplies hold the voltage constant and vary the current, and as a result, are most often used for automated welding processes such as gas metal arc welding, flux-cored arc welding, and submerged arc welding. In these processes, arc length is kept constant, since any fluctuation in the distance between the wire and the base material is quickly rectified by a large change in current. For example, if the wire and the base material get too close, the current will rapidly increase, which in turn causes the heat to increase and the tip of the wire to melt, returning it to its original separation distance.

The type of current used plays an important role in arc welding. Consumable electrode processes such as shielded metal arc welding and gas metal arc welding generally use direct current, but the electrode can be charged either positively or negatively. In welding, the positively charged anode will have a greater heat concentration, and as a result, changing the polarity of the electrode affects weld properties. If the electrode is positively charged, the base metal will be hotter, increasing weld penetration and welding speed. Alternatively, a negatively charged electrode results in more shallow welds. Non-consumable electrode processes, such as gas tungsten arc welding, can use either type of direct current, as well as alternating current. However, with direct current, because the electrode only creates the arc and does not provide filler material, a positively charged electrode causes shallow welds, while a negatively charged electrode makes deeper welds. Alternating current rapidly moves between these two, resulting in medium-penetration welds. One disadvantage of AC, the fact that the arc must be re-ignited after every zero crossings, has been addressed with the invention of special power units that produce a square wave pattern instead of the normal sine wave, making rapid zero crossings possible and minimizing the effects of the problem.

Resistance welding

Resistance welding involves the generation of heat by passing current through the resistance caused by the contact between two or more metal surfaces. Small pools of molten metal are formed at the weld area as high current (1000–100,000 A) is passed through the metal. In general, resistance welding methods are efficient and cause little pollution, but their applications are somewhat limited and the equipment cost can be high.

Spot welding is a popular resistance welding method used to join overlapping metal sheets of up to 3 mm thick. Two electrodes are simultaneously used to clamp the metal sheets together and to pass current through the sheets. The advantages of the method include efficient energy use, limited workpiece deformation, high production rates, easy automation, and no required filler materials. Weld strength is significantly lower than with other welding methods, making the process suitable for only certain applications. It is used extensively in the automotive industry—ordinary cars can have several thousand spot welds made by industrial robots. A specialized process called shot welding, can be used to spot weld stainless steel.

Like spot welding, seam welding relies on two electrodes to apply pressure and current to join metal sheets. However, instead of pointed electrodes, wheel-shaped electrodes roll along and often feed the workpiece, making it possible to make long continuous welds. In the past, this process was used in the manufacture of beverage cans, but now its uses are more limited. Other resistance welding methods include butt welding, flash welding, projection welding, and upset welding.

Energy beam welding
Energy beam welding methods, namely laser beam welding and electron beam welding, are relatively new processes that have become quite popular in high production applications. The two processes are quite similar, differing most notably in their source of power. Laser beam welding employs a highly focused laser beam, while electron beam welding is done in a vacuum and uses an electron beam. Both have a very high energy density, making deep weld penetration possible and minimizing the size of the weld area. Both processes are extremely fast, and are easily automated, making them highly productive. The primary disadvantages are their very high equipment costs (though these are decreasing) and a susceptibility to thermal cracking. Developments in this area include laser-hybrid welding, which uses principles from both laser beam welding and arc welding for even better weld properties, laser cladding, and x-ray welding.

Solid-state welding

Like the first welding process, forge welding, some modern welding methods do not involve the melting of the materials being joined. One of the most popular, ultrasonic welding, is used to connect thin sheets or wires made of metal or thermoplastic by vibrating them at high frequency and under high pressure. The equipment and methods involved are similar to that of resistance welding, but instead of electric current, vibration provides energy input. Welding metals with this process does not involve melting the materials; instead, the weld is formed by introducing mechanical vibrations horizontally under pressure. When welding plastics, the materials should have similar melting temperatures, and the vibrations are introduced vertically. Ultrasonic welding is commonly used for making electrical connections out of aluminum or copper, and it is also a very common polymer welding process.

Another common process, explosion welding, involves the joining of materials by pushing them together under extremely high pressure. The energy from the impact plasticizes the materials, forming a weld, even though only a limited amount of heat is generated. The process is commonly used for welding dissimilar materials, including bonding aluminum to carbon steel in ship hulls and stainless steel or titanium to carbon steel in petrochemical pressure vessels.

Other solid-state welding processes include friction welding (including friction stir welding and friction stir spot welding), magnetic pulse welding, co-extrusion welding, cold welding, diffusion bonding, exothermic welding, high frequency welding, hot pressure welding, induction welding, and roll bonding.

Geometry

Welds can be geometrically prepared in many different ways. The five basic types of weld joints are the butt joint, lap joint, corner joint, edge joint, and T-joint (a variant of this last is the cruciform joint). Other variations exist as well—for example, double-V preparation joints are characterized by the two pieces of material each tapering to a single center point at one-half their height. Single-U and double-U preparation joints are also fairly common—instead of having straight edges like the single-V and double-V preparation joints, they are curved, forming the shape of a U. Lap joints are also commonly more than two pieces thick—depending on the process used and the thickness of the material, many pieces can be welded together in a lap joint geometry.

Many welding processes require the use of a particular joint design; for example, resistance spot welding, laser beam welding, and electron beam welding are most frequently performed on lap joints. Other welding methods, like shielded metal arc welding, are extremely versatile and can weld virtually any type of joint. Some processes can also be used to make multipass welds, in which one weld is allowed to cool, and then another weld is performed on top of it. This allows for the welding of thick sections arranged in a single-V preparation joint, for example.

After welding, a number of distinct regions can be identified in the weld area. The weld itself is called the fusion zone—more specifically, it is where the filler metal was laid during the welding process. The properties of the fusion zone depend primarily on the filler metal used, and its compatibility with the base materials. It is surrounded by the heat-affected zone, the area that had its microstructure and properties altered by the weld. These properties depend on the base material's behavior when subjected to heat. The metal in this area is often weaker than both the base material and the fusion zone, and is also where residual stresses are found.

Quality

Many distinct factors influence the strength of welds and the material around them, including the welding method, the amount and concentration of energy input, the weldability of the base material, filler material, and flux material, the design of the joint, and the interactions between all these factors.

For example, the factor of welding position influences weld quality, that welding codes & specifications may require testing—both welding procedures and welders—using specified welding positions: 1G (flat), 2G (horizontal), 3G (vertical), 4G (overhead), 5G (horizontal fixed pipe), or 6G (inclined fixed pipe).

To test the quality of a weld, either destructive or nondestructive testing methods are commonly used to verify that welds are free of defects, have acceptable levels of residual stresses and distortion, and have acceptable heat-affected zone (HAZ) properties. Types of welding defects include cracks, distortion, gas inclusions (porosity), non-metallic inclusions, lack of fusion, incomplete penetration, lamellar tearing, and undercutting.

The metalworking industry has instituted codes and specifications to guide welders, weld inspectors, engineers, managers, and property owners in proper welding technique, design of welds, how to judge the quality of welding procedure specification, how to judge the skill of the person performing the weld, and how to ensure the quality of a welding job. Methods such as visual inspection, radiography, ultrasonic testing, phased-array ultrasonics, dye penetrant inspection, magnetic particle inspection, or industrial computed tomography can help with detection and analysis of certain defects.

Heat-affected zone
The heat-affected zone (HAZ) is a ring surrounding the weld in which the temperature of the welding process, combined with the stresses of uneven heating and cooling, alters the heat-treatment properties of the alloy. The effects of welding on the material surrounding the weld can be detrimental—depending on the materials used and the heat input of the welding process used, the HAZ can be of varying size and strength. The thermal diffusivity of the base material plays a large role—if the diffusivity is high, the material cooling rate is high and the HAZ is relatively small. Conversely, a low diffusivity leads to slower cooling and a larger HAZ. The amount of heat injected by the welding process plays an important role as well, as processes like oxyacetylene welding have an unconcentrated heat input and increase the size of the HAZ. Processes like laser beam welding give a highly concentrated, limited amount of heat, resulting in a small HAZ. Arc welding falls between these two extremes, with the individual processes varying somewhat in heat input. To calculate the heat input for arc welding procedures, the following formula can be used:

where Q = heat input (kJ/mm), V = voltage (V), I = current (A), and S = welding speed (mm/min). The efficiency is dependent on the welding process used, with shielded metal arc welding having a value of 0.75, gas metal arc welding and submerged arc welding, 0.9, and gas tungsten arc welding, 0.8. Methods of alleviating the stresses and brittleness created in the HAZ include stress relieving and tempering.

One major defect concerning the HAZ would be cracking at the toes , due to the rapid expansion (heating) and contraction (cooling) the material may not have the ability to withstand the stressed and could cause cracking, one method the control these stress would be to control the heating and cooling rate, such as pre-heating and post- heating

Lifetime extension with after treatment methods

The durability and life of dynamically loaded, welded steel structures is determined in many cases by the welds, in particular the weld transitions. Through selective treatment of the transitions by grinding (abrasive cutting), shot peening, High-frequency impact treatment, Ultrasonic impact treatment, etc. the durability of many designs increases significantly.

Metallurgy

Most solids used are engineering materials consisting of crystalline solids in which the atoms or ions are arranged in a repetitive geometric pattern which is known as a lattice structure. The only exception is material that is made from glass which is a combination of a supercooled liquid and polymers which are aggregates of large organic molecules.

Crystalline solids cohesion is obtained by a metallic or chemical bond that is formed between the constituent atoms. Chemical bonds can be grouped into two types consisting of ionic and covalent. To form an ionic bond, either a valence or bonding electron separates from one atom and becomes attached to another atom to form oppositely charged ions. The bonding in the static position is when the ions occupy an equilibrium position where the resulting force between them is zero. When the ions are exerted in tension force, the inter-ionic spacing increases creating an electrostatic attractive force, while a repulsing force under compressive force between the atomic nuclei is dominant.

Covalent bonding takes place when one of the constituent atoms loses one or more electrons, with the other atom gaining the electrons, resulting in an electron cloud that is shared by the molecule as a whole. In both ionic and covalent bonding the location of the ions and electrons are constrained relative to each other, thereby resulting in the bond being characteristically brittle.

Metallic bonding can be classified as a type of covalent bonding for which the constituent atoms are of the same type and do not combine with one another to form a chemical bond. Atoms will lose an electron(s) forming an array of positive ions. These electrons are shared by the lattice which makes the electron cluster mobile, as the electrons are free to move as well as the ions. For this, it gives metals their relatively high thermal and electrical conductivity as well as being characteristically ductile.

Three of the most commonly used crystal lattice structures in metals are the body-centred cubic, face-centred cubic and close-packed hexagonal. Ferritic steel has a body-centred cubic structure and austenitic steel, non-ferrous metals like aluminium, copper and nickel have the face-centred cubic structure.

Ductility is an important factor in ensuring the integrity of structures by enabling them to sustain local stress concentrations without fracture. In addition, structures are required to be of an acceptable strength, which is related to a material's yield strength. In general, as the yield strength of a material increases, there is a corresponding reduction in fracture toughness.

A reduction in fracture toughness may also be attributed to the embrittlement effect of impurities, or for body-centred cubic metals, from a reduction in temperature. Metals and in particular steels have a transitional temperature range where above this range the metal has acceptable notch-ductility while below this range the material becomes brittle. Within the range, the materials behavior is unpredictable. The reduction in fracture toughness is accompanied by a change in the fracture appearance. When above the transition, the fracture is primarily due to micro-void coalescence, which results in the fracture appearing fibrous. When the temperatures falls the fracture will show signs of cleavage facets. These two appearances are visible by the naked eye. Brittle fracture in steel plates may appear as chevron markings under the microscope. These arrow-like ridges on the crack surface point towards the origin of the fracture.

Fracture toughness is measured using a notched and pre-cracked rectangular specimen, of which the dimensions are specified in standards, for example ASTM E23. There are other means of estimating or measuring fracture toughness by the following: The Charpy impact test per ASTM A370; The crack-tip opening displacement (CTOD) test per BS 7448–1; The J integral test per ASTM E1820; The Pellini drop-weight test per ASTM E208.

Unusual conditions

While many welding applications are done in controlled environments such as factories and repair shops, some welding processes are commonly used in a wide variety of conditions, such as open air, underwater, and vacuums (such as space). In open-air applications, such as construction and outdoors repair, shielded metal arc welding is the most common process. Processes that employ inert gases to protect the weld cannot be readily used in such situations, because unpredictable atmospheric movements can result in a faulty weld. Shielded metal arc welding is also often used in underwater welding in the construction and repair of ships, offshore platforms, and pipelines, but others, such as flux cored arc welding and gas tungsten arc welding, are also common. Welding in space is also possible—it was first attempted in 1969 by Russian cosmonauts during the Soyuz 6 mission, when they performed experiments to test shielded metal arc welding, plasma arc welding, and electron beam welding in a depressurized environment. Further testing of these methods was done in the following decades, and today researchers continue to develop methods for using other welding processes in space, such as laser beam welding, resistance welding, and friction welding. Advances in these areas may be useful for future endeavours similar to the construction of the International Space Station, which could rely on welding for joining in space the parts that were manufactured on Earth.

Safety issues

Welding can be dangerous and unhealthy if the proper precautions are not taken. However, using new technology and proper protection greatly reduces risks of injury and death associated with welding. 

Since many common welding procedures involve an open electric arc or flame, the risk of burns and fire is significant; this is why it is classified as a hot work process. To prevent injury, welders wear personal protective equipment in the form of heavy leather gloves and protective long-sleeve jackets to avoid exposure to extreme heat and flames. Synthetic clothing such as polyester should not be worn since it may burn, causing injury. Additionally, the brightness of the weld area leads to a condition called arc eye or flash burns in which ultraviolet light causes inflammation of the cornea and can burn the retinas of the eyes. Goggles and welding helmets with dark UV-filtering face plates are worn to prevent this exposure. Since the 2000s, some helmets have included a face plate which instantly darkens upon exposure to the intense UV light. To protect bystanders, the welding area is often surrounded with translucent welding curtains. These curtains, made of a polyvinyl chloride plastic film, shield people outside the welding area from the UV light of the electric arc, but cannot replace the filter glass used in helmets.

Welders are often exposed to dangerous gases and particulate matter. Processes like flux-cored arc welding and shielded metal arc welding produce smoke containing particles of various types of oxides. The size of the particles in question tends to influence the toxicity of the fumes, with smaller particles presenting a greater danger. This is because smaller particles have the ability to cross the blood–brain barrier. Fumes and gases, such as carbon dioxide, ozone, and fumes containing heavy metals, can be dangerous to welders lacking proper ventilation and training. Exposure to manganese welding fumes, for example, even at low levels (<0.2 mg/m3), may lead to neurological problems or to damage to the lungs, liver, kidneys, or central nervous system. Nano particles can become trapped in the alveolar macrophages of the lungs and induce pulmonary fibrosis. The use of compressed gases and flames in many welding processes poses an explosion and fire risk. Some common precautions include limiting the amount of oxygen in the air, and keeping combustible materials away from the workplace.

Costs and trends
As an industrial process, the cost of welding plays a crucial role in manufacturing decisions. Many different variables affect the total cost, including equipment cost, labor cost, material cost, and energy cost. Depending on the process, equipment cost can vary, from inexpensive for methods like shielded metal arc welding and oxyfuel welding, to extremely expensive for methods like laser beam welding and electron beam welding. Because of their high cost, they are only used in high production operations. Similarly, because automation and robots increase equipment costs, they are only implemented when high production is necessary. Labor cost depends on the deposition rate (the rate of welding), the hourly wage, and the total operation time, including time spent fitting, welding, and handling the part. The cost of materials includes the cost of the base and filler material, and the cost of shielding gases. Finally, energy cost depends on arc time and welding power demand.

For manual welding methods, labor costs generally make up the vast majority of the total cost. As a result, many cost-saving measures are focused on minimizing operation time. To do this, welding procedures with high deposition rates can be selected, and weld parameters can be fine-tuned to increase welding speed. Mechanization and automation are often implemented to reduce labor costs, but this frequently increases the cost of equipment and creates additional setup time. Material costs tend to increase when special properties are necessary, and energy costs normally do not amount to more than several percent of the total welding cost.

In recent years, in order to minimize labor costs in high production manufacturing, industrial welding has become increasingly more automated, most notably with the use of robots in resistance spot welding (especially in the automotive industry) and in arc welding. In robot welding, mechanized devices both hold the material and perform the weld and at first, spot welding was its most common application, but robotic arc welding increases in popularity as technology advances. Other key areas of research and development include the welding of dissimilar materials (such as steel and aluminum, for example) and new welding processes, such as friction stir, magnetic pulse, conductive heat seam, and laser-hybrid welding. Furthermore, progress is desired in making more specialized methods like laser beam welding practical for more applications, such as in the aerospace and automotive industries. Researchers also hope to better understand the often unpredictable properties of welds, especially microstructure, residual stresses, and a weld's tendency to crack or deform.

The trend of accelerating the speed at which welds are performed in the steel erection industry comes at a risk to the integrity of the connection. Without proper fusion to the base materials provided by sufficient arc time on the weld, a project inspector cannot ensure the effective diameter of the puddle weld therefore he or she cannot guarantee the published load capacities unless they witness the actual installation. This method of puddle welding is common in the United States and Canada for attaching steel sheets to bar joist and structural steel members. Regional agencies are responsible for ensuring the proper installation of puddle welding on steel construction sites. Currently there is no standard or weld procedure which can ensure the published holding capacity of any unwitnessed connection, but this is under review by the American Welding Society.

Glass and plastic welding

Glasses and certain types of plastics are commonly welded materials. Unlike metals, which have a specific melting point, glasses and plastics have a melting range, called the glass transition. When heating the solid material past the glass-transition temperature (Tg) into this range, it will generally become softer and more pliable. When it crosses through the range, above the glass-melting temperature (Tm), it will become a very thick, sluggish, viscous liquid, slowly decreasing in viscosity as temperature increases. Typically, this viscous liquid will have very little surface tension compared to metals, becoming a sticky, taffy to honey-like consistency, so welding can usually take place by simply pressing two melted surfaces together. The two liquids will generally mix and join at first contact. Upon cooling through the glass transition, the welded piece will solidify as one solid piece of amorphous material.

Glass welding

Glass welding is a common practice during glassblowing. It is used very often in the construction of lighting, neon signs, flashtubes, scientific equipment, and the manufacture of dishes and other glassware. It is also used during glass casting for joining the halves of glass molds, making items such as bottles and jars. Welding glass is accomplished by heating the glass through the glass transition, turning it into a thick, formable, liquid mass. Heating is usually done with a gas or oxy-gas torch, or a furnace, because the temperatures for melting glass are often quite high. This temperature may vary, depending on the type of glass. Sometimes a tube may be attached to the glass, allowing it to be blown into various shapes, such as bulbs, bottles, or tubes. When two pieces of liquid glass are pressed together, they will usually weld very readily. Welding a handle onto a pitcher can usually be done with relative ease. However, when welding a tube to another tube, a combination of blowing and suction, and pressing and pulling is used to ensure a good seal, to shape the glass, and to keep the surface tension from closing the tube in on itself. Sometimes a filler rod may be used, but usually not.

Because glass is very brittle in its solid state, it is often prone to cracking upon heating and cooling, especially if the heating and cooling are uneven. This is because the brittleness of glass does not allow for uneven thermal expansion. Glass that has been welded will usually need to be cooled very slowly and evenly through the glass transition, in a process called annealing, to relieve any internal stresses created by a temperature gradient.

There are many types of glass, and it is most common to weld using the same types. Different glasses often have different rates of thermal expansion, which can cause them to crack upon cooling when they contract differently. For instance, quartz has very low thermal expansion, while soda-lime glass has very high thermal expansion. When welding different glasses to each other, it is usually important to closely match their coefficients of thermal expansion, to ensure that cracking does not occur. Also, some glasses will simply not mix with others, so welding between certain types may not be possible.

Glass can also be welded to metals and ceramics, although with metals the process is usually more adhesion to the surface of the metal rather than a commingling of the two materials. However, certain glasses will typically bond only to certain metals. For example, lead glass bonds readily to copper or molybdenum, but not to aluminum. Tungsten electrodes are often used in lighting but will not bond to quartz glass, so the tungsten is often wetted with molten borosilicate glass, which bonds to both tungsten and quartz. However, care must be taken to ensure that all materials have similar coefficients of thermal expansion to prevent cracking both when the object cools and when it is heated again. Special alloys are often used for this purpose, ensuring that the coefficients of expansion match, and sometimes thin, metallic coatings may be applied to a metal to create a good bond with the glass.

Plastic welding

Plastics are generally divided into two categories, which are "thermosets" and "thermoplastics." A thermoset is a plastic in which a chemical reaction sets the molecular bonds after first forming the plastic, and then the bonds cannot be broken again without degrading the plastic. Thermosets cannot be melted, therefore, once a thermoset has set it is impossible to weld it. Examples of thermosets include epoxies, silicone, vulcanized rubber, polyester, and polyurethane.

Thermoplastics, by contrast, form long molecular chains, which are often coiled or intertwined, forming an amorphous structure without any long-range, crystalline order. Some thermoplastics may be fully amorphous, while others have a partially crystalline/partially amorphous structure. Both amorphous and semicrystalline thermoplastics have a glass transition, above which welding can occur, but semicrystallines also have a specific melting point which is above the glass transition. Above this melting point, the viscous liquid will become a free-flowing liquid (see rheological weldability for thermoplastics). Examples of thermoplastics include polyethylene, polypropylene, polystyrene, polyvinylchloride (PVC), and fluoroplastics like Teflon and Spectralon.

Welding thermoplastic is very similar to welding glass. The plastic first must be cleaned and then heated through the glass transition, turning the weld-interface into a thick, viscous liquid. Two heated interfaces can then be pressed together, allowing the molecules to mix through intermolecular diffusion, joining them as one. Then the plastic is cooled through the glass transition, allowing the weld to solidify. A filler rod may often be used for certain types of joints. The main differences between welding glass and plastic are the types of heating methods, the much lower melting temperatures, and the fact that plastics will burn if overheated. Many different methods have been devised for heating plastic to a weldable temperature without burning it. Ovens or electric heating tools can be used to melt the plastic. Ultrasonic, laser, or friction heating are other methods. Resistive metals may be implanted in the plastic, which respond to induction heating. Some plastics will begin to burn at temperatures lower than their glass transition, so welding can be performed by blowing a heated, inert gas onto the plastic, melting it while, at the same time, shielding it from oxygen.

Many thermoplastics can also be welded using chemical solvents. When placed in contact with the plastic, the solvent will begin to soften it, bringing the surface into a thick, liquid solution. When two melted surfaces are pressed together, the molecules in the solution mix, joining them as one. Because the solvent can permeate the plastic, the solvent evaporates out through the surface of the plastic, causing the weld to drop out of solution and solidify. A common use for solvent welding is for joining PVC or ABS (acrylonitrile butadiene styrene) pipes during plumbing, or for welding styrene and polystyrene plastics in the construction of models. Solvent welding is especially effective on plastics like PVC which burn at or below their glass transition, but may be ineffective on plastics like Teflon or polyethylene that are resistant to chemical decomposition.

See also
Aluminium joining
Fasteners
List of welding codes
List of welding processes
Welding Procedure Specification
Welder certification
Welded sculpture

References

Sources

External links 

Pipes Joint Welding
Welding Process

 
IARC Group 1 carcinogens
Articles containing video clips
Joining
Mechanical engineering